John Farrell VC (March 1826, Dublin – 31 August 1865) was a British Army soldier and Irish recipient of the Victoria Cross, the highest and most prestigious award for gallantry in the face of the enemy that can be awarded to British and Commonwealth forces.

He was a sergeant in the 17th Lancers (Duke of Cambridge's Own), British Army during the Crimean War when the following deed took place for which he was awarded the VC:

He later achieved the rank of Quartermaster-Sergeant. He was killed in action at Secunderabad, British India, on 31 August 1865.

References

The Register of the Victoria Cross (1981, 1988 and 1997)

Ireland's VCs (Dept of Economic Development, 1995)
Monuments to Courage (David Harvey, 1999)
Irish Winners of the Victoria Cross (Richard Doherty & David Truesdale, 2000)

1826 births
1865 deaths
19th-century Irish people
Irish soldiers in the British Army
Military personnel from Dublin (city)
17th Lancers soldiers
Crimean War recipients of the Victoria Cross
British Army personnel of the Crimean War
Irish recipients of the Victoria Cross
British military personnel killed in action in India
British Army recipients of the Victoria Cross